Hugh Carmine McCracken (March 31, 1942 – March 28, 2013) was an American rock guitarist and session musician based in New York City, primarily known for his performance on guitar and also as a harmonica player.  McCracken was additionally an arranger and record producer.

Biography
Born in Glen Ridge, New Jersey, McCracken grew up in Hackensack, New Jersey.

Especially in demand in the 1960s, 1970s and 1980s, McCracken appeared on many recordings by Steely Dan, as well as albums by Donald Fagen, Jimmy Rushing, Billy Joel, Roland Kirk, Roberta Flack, B. B. King, Hue and Cry, John Lennon, Paul McCartney, The Monkees, Paul Simon, Art Garfunkel, Idris Muhammad, James Taylor, Phoebe Snow, Bob Dylan, Linda McCartney, Carly Simon, Graham Parker, Yoko Ono, Eric Carmen, Loudon Wainwright III, Lou Donaldson, Aretha Franklin, Bob James, Van Morrison, The Four Seasons, Hall & Oates, Don McLean, Hank Crawford, Jerry Jemmott, Gary Wright and Andy Gibb.

In the middle 1960s, McCracken played in a North Jersey night club cover band called The Funatics under the stage name of Mack Pierce. The band became Mario & The Funatics for a short time when it merged with saxophonist Mario Madison. He was a member of Mike Mainieri's White Elephant Orchestra (1969–1972), a 20-piece experimental jazz-rock outfit based in New York City. The band was made up of Steve Gadd, Tony Levin, Warren Bernhardt, George Young, Frank Vicari, Michael Brecker, Ronnie Cuber, Jon Faddis, Lew Soloff, Randy Brecker, Barry Rogers, Jon Pierson, Steve Goodman, David Spinozza and Joe Beck.

Among the many albums he performed on was the 1970 recording by writer/critic Robert Palmer's Insect Trust, Hoboken Saturday Night, together with Bernard "Pretty" Purdie and Elvin Jones. In 1971, because of such high demand for his work, McCracken declined Paul McCartney's invitation to help form his new band, Wings. McCracken also played on, arranged and co-produced with Tommy LiPuma, Dr. John's City Lights (1978) and Tango Palace (1979).

His most well-known work was the slide guitar solo in "All By Myself" by Eric Carmen, the guitar solo in "Hey Nineteen" by Steely Dan, and the main guitar playing fills on Van Morrison classic "Brown-Eyed Girl".

Death 
Hugh McCracken died on Thursday March 28, 2013 in Manhattan. He was 70. Holly, his wife of 43 years said the cause was leukemia.

Discography
1967: Blowin' Your Mind! – Van Morrison
1967: Walk Away Renee/Pretty Ballerina – The Left Banke
1968: Did She Mention My Name? – Gordon Lightfoot
1968: Eli and the Thirteenth Confession – Laura Nyro
1968: The Circle Game – Tom Rush
1968: Livin' the Blues – Jimmy Rushing
1969: Today – Gloria Loring
1969: Completely Well – B.B. King
1969: Everything's Archie – The Archies
1970: A Time To Remember! – The Artie Kornfeld Tree (ABC/Dunhill Records; Cat. DS 50092)
1970: Hoboken Saturday Night –  The Insect Trust (Atco Records; Cat. SD 33-313)
1970: Outlaw – Eugene McDaniels (Atlantic; Cat. SD 8259)
1970: Changes – The Monkees
1970: Indianola Mississippi Seeds – B.B. King
1971: Headless Heroes of the Apocalypse – Eugene McDaniels
1971: Ram – Paul McCartney
1971: Mike Corbett & Jay Hirsh (with Hugh McCracken) - S/T (Atco Records)
1971: Gary Wright - Extraction (A&M Records)
1971: Flagrant Délit – Johnny Hallyday (France; Philips; Cat. 6325 003)
1971: Quiet Fire – Roberta Flack
1971: The Good Book – Melanie
1971: Barbra Joan Streisand – Barbra Streisand
1972: Album III – Loudon Wainwright III
1972: Stoneground Words – Melanie
1972: Sweet Buns & Barbeque – Houston Person
1972: David Clayton-Thomas – David Clayton-Thomas
1972: Young, Gifted and Black – Aretha Franklin
1972: Yvonne Elliman – Yvonne Elliman 
1973: Abandoned Luncheonette – Daryl Hall & John Oates
1973: Sassy Soul Strut – Lou Donaldson
1973: For the Good Times - Rusty Bryant
1973: From the Depths of My Soul – Marlena Shaw
1973: Breezy Stories – Danny O'Keefe (Atlantic; Cat. SD 7264)
1973: Daybreaks – John Wonderling (Paramount; Cat. 6063)
1973: Extension of a Man – Donny Hathaway
1973: Bette Midler – Bette Midler
1974: Your Baby Is a Lady – Jackie DeShannon
1974: With Everything I Feel in Me – Aretha Franklin
1974: Madrugada – Melanie
1974: Walking Man – James Taylor
1974: Until It's Time for You to Go – Rusty Bryant
1974: Let Me in Your Life – Aretha Franklin 
1974: One – Bob James
1975: Desire – Bob Dylan 
1975: Still Crazy After All These Years – Paul Simon
1975: Katy Lied - Steely Dan
1975: The Case of the 3 Sided Dream in Audio Color - Rahsaan Roland Kirk
1975: Feel Like Makin' Love – Roberta Flack
1975: New York Connection – Tom Scott
1975: First Cuckoo – Deodato
1975: Peach Melba – Melba Moore
1976: Just a Matter of Time – Marlena Shaw
1976: Yellow & Green – Ron Carter
1976: Second Childhood – Phoebe Snow
1976: Everything Must Change – Randy Crawford
1976: Pastels – Ron Carter
1976: Smile – Laura Nyro
1976: Three – Bob James
1977: Havana Candy – Patti Austin
1977: The Stranger – Billy Joel
1977: Blue Lights in the Basement – Roberta Flack
1977: A Song – Neil Sedaka
1977: Never Letting Go – Phoebe Snow
1977: Celebrate Me Home – Kenny Loggins
1977: Watermark – Art Garfunkel
1977: Blow It Out – Tom Scott
1977: Ghost Writer – Garland Jeffreys
1978: Pick 'Em – Ron Carter
1978: 52nd Street – Billy Joel
1978: Roberta Flack – Roberta Flack
1978: Boys in the Trees – Carly Simon
1978: City Lights – Dr. John (US; Horizon Records & Tapes; SP 732)
1978: Intimate Strangers – Tom Scott
1978: One-Eyed Jack – Garland Jeffreys
1979: Tango Palace – Dr. John (US; Horizon Records & Tapes; SP 740)
1979: Headin' Home – Gary Wright
1979: Fate for Breakfast – Art Garfunkel
1979: Street Beat – Tom Scott
1980: After Dark – Andy Gibb
1980: Double Fantasy – John Lennon and Yoko Ono
1980: Naughty – Chaka Khan
1980: Red Cab to Manhattan – Stephen Bishop
1980: One-Trick Pony – Paul Simon
1980: Gaucho – Steely Dan
1980: One Bad Habit – Michael Franks
1981: Apple Juice – Tom Scott
1981: There Must Be a Better World Somewhere – B.B. King
1981: Torch – Carly Simon 
1981: Season of Glass – Yoko Ono
1981: 4 – Foreigner
1982: The Nightfly – Donald Fagen
1982: Another Grey Area – Graham Parker
1982: Hey Ricky – Melissa Manchester
1982: It's Alright (I See Rainbows) –Yoko Ono
1982: Objects of Desire – Michael Franks
1982: Anyone Can See – Irene Cara
1983: Guts for Love – Garland Jeffreys
1983: Emergency – Melissa Manchester
1983: Dirty Looks – Juice Newton
1983: Burlap & Satin – Dolly Parton
1983: Hello Big Man – Carly Simon
1984: Milk and Honey – John Lennon and Yoko Ono
1985: Skin Dive – Michael Franks
1987: Jill Jones – Jill Jones
1987: Coming Around Again – Carly Simon 
1987: Inside Information – Foreigner
1988: Lefty – Art Garfunkel
1988: Hot Water – Jimmy Buffett
1989: Steady On – Shawn Colvin
1991: Don't Call Me Buckwheat – Garland Jeffreys
1997: A Story – Yoko Ono
1997: Alta suciedad – Andrés Calamaro
1997: Deuces Wild – B.B. King
2000: Two Against Nature - Steely Dan
2003: Everything Must Go – Steely Dan
2003: The Diary of Alicia Keys - Alicia Keys 
2005: Restless Angel – Marie Gabrielle (co-producer)
2006: Morph the Cat – Donald Fagen
2007: Romancing the '60s – Frankie Valli
2011: Stronger – Kelly Clarkson
2012: The King of In Between – Garland Jeffreys
2014: Life Journey – Leon Russell

References

External links

1942 births
2013 deaths
Deaths from leukemia
American session musicians
American rock guitarists
American male guitarists
People from Glen Ridge, New Jersey
People from Hackensack, New Jersey
Guitarists from New Jersey
American harmonica players
Deaths from cancer in New York (state)
American mandolinists
American pop guitarists
Lead guitarists
Rhythm guitarists
Slide guitarists
Plastic Ono Band members
20th-century American guitarists
Guitarists from New York City
White Elephant Orchestra members